Precious Mpala is a Zimbabwean former footballer who played as a midfielder. Nicknamed Gringo, she has been a member of the Zimbabwe women's national team.

International career
Mpala capped for Zimbabwe at senior level during the 2000 African Women's Championship.

International goals
Scores and results list Zimbabwe goal tally first

References

Living people
Zimbabwean women's footballers
Women's association football midfielders
Zimbabwe women's international footballers
Year of birth missing (living people)